Mattie Lee Price (1869–1899) of Bartow County, Georgia, United States, was just 14 when she became the second of the Georgia Wonder girls to come out of Georgia, USA during the winter of 1883–1884.  Georgia Wonder girls were pre-vaudeville acts in which the young women performed feats of strength, usually pitted against men. They used fulcrum and leverage techniques to lift heavy men in chairs, twist hickory sticks out of strong men's hands, and other feats of strength. There were variations of the act that included balance tests. "Lulu" Hurst (born Lula Hurst), of Polk County, who was 15 at the time she began her act, started the phenomenon. She gave a magic demonstration at her father's farm in late December 1883. Dixie Haygood, with the stage name of Annie Abbott, was also a famous Georgia stage magician, performing an almost identical act.

The launch of Mattie Lee Price
Mattie Price gave her first public appearance in late January 1884 at the historical Stilesboro Academy in the village of Stilesboro, Georgia.  Since Lula Hurst only lived a few miles away from Mattie Lee Price, it is assumed that she saw Lula perform and was able to imitate the act immediately.

A stock company was formed in Cartersville, Georgia to promote Mattie and put her on tour.  The company consisted of Mr. Patillo, Col. A. P. Wofford, and Mr. Dock Cunyus.  Mattie's father, George Washington Price, contracted his daughter's act with the company for $10,000 per year.

The stock company that held Mattie under contract was sued by Mr Harris of the Harris Mammoth Museum in Cincinnati in June 1884 in the Common Pleas Court of Hamilton County, Ohio, Harris v. Cumyns. The Cartersville stock company subsequently sold Mattie's contract to R.E.J. Miles of Cincinnati. After this lawsuit and the breakup of the "stock company," Mattie's name was never again found in the Cartersville, Georgia newspaper.

Mattie Lee Price was illiterate and had never ridden a train prior to her Georgia Wonder debut. During 1884, she was on stage in Georgia, Tennessee, Kentucky, Ohio, Minnesota, Pennsylvania, Utah, Kansas, New York, Illinois, and Maryland.  She traveled with her father and one or another male manager.

When the contract with R.E.J. Miles expired in early 1885, Mattie and her father returned to Georgia and toured the south giving demonstrations.  Mattie Lee Price married Samuel Wise on 28 November 1885 in Madison, Florida. Three more husbands were in her future, William W. White (1888), Louis Barella (1894) and Louis Aronson (date unknown).

Lulu Hurst, the original Georgia Wonder, married her fiancé, Paul Atkinson, in Polk County, Georgia on 9 February 1887 and never returned to the stage.

Mattie Lee Price in Europe
During late 1891 and early 1892, Mattie Lee Price was in Ireland, Scotland, Wales, and England giving demonstrations.  Annie Abbott (also known as Dixie Haygood) was also in Europe presenting an almost identical act.  Many "magnetic" and "electric" girls were showing off their skills in innumerable locations both in Europe and the North American continent at the time.

Return to North America
Mattie Lee Price worked in various dime museums and opera houses and joined circuses during summer months.  Mattie was one of the featured performers at opening of The Robinson's Musee, in Toronto, Canada in 1891.  After the World's Columbian Exposition  ended in 1893, she was on the same venue as Harry Houdini at the Kohl & Middleton’s South Clark Street dime museum in Chicago.  Harry Houdini wrote about Mattie Lee Price and her effective marketing manager/husband, W.W. White in his books, Harry Houdini for Kids: His Life and Adventures and Miracle Mongers and Their Methods.

Known as Gaza

In early 1894, Mattie Lee Price began using  "GAZA" or "Mysterious GAZA" instead of her real name.  Mr. Brigg of England challenged Mattie Lee Price's act at Frank Hall's Casino in Chicago, Illinois in January 1894.  He proclaimed her act to be one of physics rather than one of magical, magnetic, or electrical power.  A contest between Mr. Brigg and Mattie Lee Price was arranged where Mr. Brigg used demonstrations, drawings, and a stereopticon to convince the audience that they could use these same physical forces to better harness their horses and more efficiently pull loads.

Soon after the Brigg affair, Mattie was advertised with the Walter L. Main Circus in 1894 and billed as "Gaza the strong woman." She was a featured act on a lithographic poster printed to promote her.  Part of the advertisement reads:  "The Magnetic Wonder a Human Magnet of Strength and Weight the phenomenon of the 19th century, lifting hundreds of pounds of dead weight by just placing her hands on it, twisting bars of iron, resisting as much force as can push on a 12 foot pole by simply placing her hands at one end. It cannot be justly pictured, no words adequate to describe it."

In 1895 Mattie was with the Barnum & Bailey Circus as part of the concert. She was listed as "Mattie Lee Price, The Mysterious Gaza.  The Georgia Wonder." During the summer of 1897 Mattie Lee Price was with the Great Wallace Shows (circus) out of Cincinnati, Ohio and billed as "Gaza the Magnetic Girl."

In England

Mattie was with The Barnum & Bailey Greatest Show on Earth in London, England in 1898. She is 8th from the left on the raised stages shown on the "Peerless Prodigies of Physical Phenomena" poster from that year. On 11 March 1899, Mattie Lee Price passed away at number 81 Hammersmith Road, Fulham District, London, England.  She is buried in the old Fulham Burial Ground in England in an unmarked grave.  Many members of the freak department attended her funeral. The funeral took place on 13 March at 2:30 p.m.

Family
Mattie Lee Price was born on 19 May 1869 somewhere in the vicinity of Rome, Georgia.  Her father was George Washington Price and her mother, Rhoda P. McAbee.  Mattie's parents were married in Floyd County, Georgia in 1868.  Mattie's mother and two siblings died in some unknown incident about 1874. Elizabeth Penland became Mattie's step-mother.

Mattie Price had two children, Charles and Jeanette. They were with her in England when she died having newly arrived by boat from New York.  After the death of their mother, the children were left as orphans and recorded as "boarders" on a farm in Lena, Wisconsin in the 1900 Federal Census.

She was the youngest of the Georgia Wonders that mesmerized the public in 1884.   Miss Price was often described as very thin with gray eyes and as having hair of three distinct colors. Houdini wrote she was, "barely ninety pounds, and had the sickly look of a ‘consumptive.’" And, "yet this weakling was able to perform feats requiring super human strength and endurance from either good spirits or the devil himself."

References

External links

1869 births
1899 deaths
People from Georgia (U.S. state)
American magicians
American performance artists
Sideshow performers
Burials in England